Projet Montréal (officially  Projet Montréal - Équipe Valérie Plante) is a progressive, environmentalist municipal political party in Montreal, Quebec, Canada. Founded in 2004, it is led by Valérie Plante, and holds a majority of seats on Montreal City Council.

Origins
Projet Montréal was created by environmental activists in May 2004.

Electoral performance

Richard Bergeron was the party's first mayoral candidate. He was elected to the City Council in 2005 and gathered 8.53% of the vote for Mayor.

In the September 2006 by-election held in the district of Marie-Victorin, Projet Montreal candidate and former city councillor Kettly Beauregard won 31.7% of the vote, for a strong second-place finish.

In December 2007, candidate Jean-Claude Marsan took second place with 37.43% in a by-election to replace disgraced Outremont borough mayor Stephane Harbour. At the same time, there was a by-election in Outremont's Robert-Bourassa district to replace Marie Cinq-Mars, who chose to run for borough mayor. Candidate Denise Rochefort also placed second, with 35.13% of the vote.

In the 2009 Montreal municipal election, Bergeron led the party through steadily increasing polls to a strong third-place showing, winning fourteen seats on city and borough councils, including two borough mayors, and sweeping Le Plateau-Mont-Royal.

In April 2012, Érika Duchesne won a by-election in the Vieux-Rosemont district of Rosemont-La Petite Patrie, giving Project Montreal its 11th seat on city council.

In the 2013 Montreal municipal election, Projet Montréal doubled its number of seats within city council, going from 10 to 20. Projet Montreal became the official opposition against Denis Coderre's team. After the election, Richard Bergeron stated that he would resign his party leadership within the next 12 or 24 months. He admitted that he was disappointed with the election results, but that he would remain to make Projet Montréal into a true opposition to Coderre's administration.

In the 2017 Montreal Municipal Election, Projet Montreal had won a majority of seats in the city council as well as having its Mayoral Candidate Valérie Plante become the mayor of Montréal.

Platform

Projet Montréal advocates sustainable urbanism, which is the application of the principles of sustainable development to an urban setting, such as Downtown Montreal. One of the party's proposals consists of building light rail in order to do the following:
 reduce car traffic;
 give more room to pedestrians and cyclists;
 increase the residents' quality of life and
 reverse urban sprawl.

Projet Montréal's 2009 platform elaborates commitments for seven major aspects of urban living:

 renewal and expansion of participatory democracy
 affordable housing and reinforcing socio-urban tissue
 sustainable transport (public transit and active transit)
 environmental sustainability
 economic development
 culture
 accountability and public services

Mayoral candidates

Victories are indicated with bold fonts.

Councillors

Projet Montréal currently holds the following seats on Montreal City Council and borough councils.

City councillors

Borough councillors

The city councillors listed above all sit on the councils of their respective boroughs. In addition to these, the party holds the following seats on borough councils.

References

External links
Projet Montréal Official website

Municipal political parties in Montreal